Weekend Adventure (originally known as ABC Weekend Adventure and Litton's Weekend Adventure) is an American syndicated programming block that is produced by Hearst Media Production Group, and airs weekend mornings on the owned-and-operated stations and affiliates of ABC. The block features live-action documentary and lifestyle series aimed at a family audience that meet educational programming requirements defined by the Children's Television Act. Announced on May 24, 2011, Litton's Weekend Adventure premiered on September 3, 2011, replacing the ABC Kids block.

The block is syndicated to ABC stations directly rather than being part of the network's official schedule. This was the result of a compromise between the network and its stations after ABC management decided in 2010 that it no longer wanted to provide educational programming. Thus, Weekend Adventure does not contain any ABC branding or promotions, and likewise is not promoted directly by ABC on-air or mentioned on the network's website.

Background
The block came as a result of ABC's decision in March 2010 to no longer provide E/I programming as part of its Saturday morning network lineup to its affiliates; the network had not introduced any new E/I programs for its ABC Kids block since 2007, and those that had been airing on the network at the time of the decision consisted of reruns of Disney Channel sitcoms that had first aired on the block between September 2005 and May 2007, all of which were out of production by the time ABC Kids ended its run. In addition, before Haim Saban and Saban Brands repurchased the rights to the Power Rangers franchise from The Walt Disney Company in 2010, several station groups that owned ABC affiliates (such as Hearst Television, which would later acquire a majority stake in Litton Entertainment in 2017 and Allbritton Communications) refused to carry any series from that franchise (or any other non-E/I-compliant shows within the block such as Kim Possible) or chose to run them only in low-rated early morning timeslots, and had demanded any lineup be fully educational so the stations would not have to purchase E/I programming from syndication distributors.

Most of the major commercial networks began restructuring their Saturday morning children's program blocks (with Fox dropping its outright) to comply to tightened educational content and advertising regulations in the Children's Television Act; cultural shifts and changes in viewing habits through the migration of younger viewers to cable channels, recordable and streaming media were also affecting viewership of children's lineups carried by broadcast television networks.

As a compromise, the network's affiliate board agreed to instead look for a syndication package that would air exclusively on ABC owned-and-operated and affiliate stations. Litton Entertainment was eventually selected by the ABC affiliate board to program the block, beating out two other competitors as a part of the winning presentation in which Litton suggested counterprogramming the then-usual Saturday morning fare by featuring unscripted and "pro-social programming" aimed at children and teenagers ages 7–17.

History
ABC and Litton Entertainment announced the block on May 24, 2011 for a fall 2011 launch, under the working title "ABC Weekend Adventure." ABC initially signed deals with its owned-and-operated station group ABC Owned Television Stations, as well as affiliates owned by Cox Broadcasting, The McGraw-Hill Companies, Newport Television, and Post-Newsweek Stations to carry the block; these were followed by May 2011 with distribution agreements involving ABC stations owned by Belo, Bonten Media Group, Chambers Communications Corporation, Fisher Communications, Gannett Company, Hubbard Broadcasting, The E. W. Scripps Company, LIN TV Corporation, News-Press & Gazette Company, Young Broadcasting, and Weigel Broadcasting.

The renamed Litton's Weekend Adventure launched on September 3, 2011 with six series: Jack Hanna's Wild Countdown, Ocean Mysteries with Jeff Corwin, Born to Explore with Richard Wiese, Culture Click, Everyday Health, and Food for Thought with Claire Thomas (originally titled The Delicious Adventures of Claire Thomas prior to its debut). Two other series were also initially announced to be in development: the environment-focused Agents of Change (from producer Mark Koops) and Earth: Angry Planet; however, neither show was picked up to series. When the block debuted, Litton's Weekend Adventure became the first Saturday morning block to present all of its programs in high definition. On May 2, 2012, ABC and Litton reached an agreement to broadcast Weekend Adventure worldwide on the American Forces Network, beginning that June.

On September 24, 2012, Litton announced that a television version of Everyday Health's YouTube series Recipe Rehab (one of several web series directly funded by the video sharing website as a part of a premium content initiative) would premiere on the block beginning on October 6, 2012 replacing the Everyday Health series.

On September 28, 2013, Litton launched a competing Saturday morning block for CBS, the CBS Dream Team (which replaced the Cookie Jar TV block). The following week on October 5, 2013, the Weekend Adventure block's "Health and Wellness Hour" (consisting of health and culinary programs that filled the third hour of the block) was discontinued as part of a refocusing towards exclusively wildlife-focused programs, with the move, Recipe Rehab migrated to CBS's Dream Team block.

Subsequently, on October 4, 2014, Expedition Wild moved from Weekend Adventure to another Saturday morning block produced by Litton that launched on that date, One Magnificent Morning on The CW.

In 2016, two stations disaffiliated from ABC due to varied issues; WKPT-TV in the Tri-Cities region of Tennessee and Virginia, and WSVI in the U.S. Virgin Islands, but as the Litton syndication contract for Weekend Adventure is separate from their expired ABC affiliation agreements, were able to continue to air Weekend Adventure for the time being. The new Tri-Cities ABC affiliate, WJHL-DT2, used programming from the Fox-associated Xploration Station block (which was turned down by WEMT) and other syndicated programming for their E/I contributions instead. In April 2017, Weekend Adventure moved to WJHL-DT2 after WKPT voided all of their syndication contracts to become a full-time carrier of Cozi TV.

Programming
Programs featured on Litton's Weekend Adventure are designed to meet federally mandated educational programming guidelines, allowing ABC stations to comply with the three-hour weekly minimum for E/I content defined by the Federal Communications Commission. However, some ABC stations may carry syndicated educational programs to provide additional E/I content supplementary to the block. Programs aired within the block may be deferred to Sunday daytime slots, or (in the case of affiliates in the Western United States) Saturday afternoons due to breaking news or severe weather coverage or, more commonly, regional or select national sports broadcasts (especially in the case of college football tournaments) scheduled in earlier Saturday timeslots as makegoods to comply with the E/I regulations. Some stations may air the entirety of the Weekend Adventure block on tape delay to accommodate local news or other programs of local interest (such as public affairs shows, real estate or lifestyle programs).

Current programming

Former programming

Awards and nominations
In 2014, Ocean Mysteries with Jeff Corwin won two Creative Arts Daytime Emmy Awards for "Outstanding Travel Program".

References

Brokered programming
American Broadcasting Company original programming
Litton Entertainment
Television programming blocks in the United States
Television shows featuring audio description